Bergua is a locality located in the municipality of Broto, in Huesca province, Aragon, Spain. As of 2020, it has a population of 25.

Geography 
Bergua is located 77km north-northeast of Huesca.

References

Populated places in the Province of Huesca